Wilhelm Schmieger was an Austrian international footballer. At club level, he played for Wiener Sport-Club. He made 7 appearances for the Austria national team, scoring five goals. He also managed Wiener Sport-Club. In addition, he also acted as referee in various international matches between 1914 and 1916.

External links
 
 

Association football forwards
Austrian footballers
Austria international footballers
Wiener Sport-Club players
Wiener Sport-Club managers
1887 births
1950 deaths
Austrian football managers